The President of Nicaragua, officially known as the President of the Republic of Nicaragua, is the head of state and head of government of Nicaragua. The office was created in the Constitution of 1854. From 1825 until the Constitution of 1839, the head of state of Nicaragua was styled simply as Head of State (Jefe de Estado), and from 1839 to 1854 as Supreme Director (Supremo Director).

The incumbent President, Daniel Ortega, has served as president since 2007.

The presidential term was set at five years from 1985 to 1990, seven years from 1990 to 1997, and was reduced to five years again in 1997.

From 1990 to 2009, the President was barred from immediate reelection. An incumbent President could run again after waiting five years, but if successful would have to leave office for good at the end of his second, nonconsecutive term. However, in 2009, the Supreme Court of Nicaragua ruled that the constitutional ban on immediate reelection was unenforceable. In 2014, the legislature amended the constitution to allow the President to run for an unlimited number of five-year terms.

Heads of state of Nicaragua

Heads of the state of Nicaragua within the Federal Republic of Central America (1822–1838)

Supreme directors (1838–1854)

Presidents of the Republic of Nicaragua (1854–present)

Latest election

See also

 History of Nicaragua
 List of years in Nicaragua

References

External links

 Presidentes de Nicaragua

 
1854 establishments in Nicaragua
Presidents
n